Williams-Gierth House, also known as The Castle House is a historic home located at Poplar Bluff, Butler County, Missouri.  It was built in 1892, and is a large -story, irregular plan, Shingle Style dwelling. It features a reconstructed wraparound porch, two turrets, and a hipped roof with polygonal dormer.

It was added to the National Register of Historic Places in 2012.

References

Houses on the National Register of Historic Places in Missouri
Shingle Style architecture in Missouri
Houses completed in 1892
Buildings and structures in Butler County, Missouri
National Register of Historic Places in Butler County, Missouri